The Handbook of the Christian Knight, sometimes translated as The Manual of the Christian Knight or The Handbook of the Christian Soldier, is a work written by Dutch scholar Erasmus of Rotterdam in 1501, and was first published in English in 1533 by William Tyndale.

During a stay in Tournehem, a castle near Saint-Omer in the north of modern-day France, Erasmus encountered an uncivilized, yet friendly soldier who was an acquaintance of Battus, Erasmus' close friend. On the request of the soldier's pious wife, who felt slighted by her husband's behaviour, Battus asked Erasmus to write a text which would convince the soldier of the necessity of mending his ways, which Erasmus did. The resulting work was eventually re-drafted by Erasmus and expanded into the Enchiridion militis Christiani. The Enchiridion is an appeal on Christians to act in accordance with the Christian faith rather than merely performing the necessary rites. It became one of Erasmus' most influential works.

Enchiridion makes reference to the Pauline "spiritual armor" metaphor, which in the 16th century only gained in popularity as a result of Erasmus' work. Interpreting the famous German artwork Knight, Death, and Devil, scholars believe the image of the knight (shown dressed in armor) can be interpreted from an Erasmian viewpoint to represent the knight who is able to vanquish his enemies by ignoring them "in his pursuit of Christian virtue".

See also
Online Library of Liberty, Full text available online in HTML and PDF

Footnotes

1503 books
16th-century Christian texts
Books by Desiderius Erasmus
Chivalry
16th-century Latin books